Denis Alexeyevich Kolodin (born 11 January 1982) is a Russian football coach and former central defender. He was called up to the Russia squad for UEFA Euro 2008 in Austria and Switzerland.

Career

Club
During his career, Kolodin has played for a number of Russian clubs. He started his career at FC Olimpia Volgograd where he remained for two years, scoring an impressive fourteen goals in 66 appearances before moving to FC Uralan in 2003. He made 44 appearances for the club and scored three goals. In 2004, he left for Krylia Sovetov, making 39 appearances and scoring two goals.

He moved to one of Russia's bigger clubs, Dynamo Moscow in 2005, and has had a successful time there, making 130 appearances and scoring fifteen goals along the way (as of 22 May 2012).

International
Kolodin received his first international call-up for the Russian national team in 2004. As of 21 June 2008 he has made thirteen appearances for the national team .

Euro 2008
Kolodin got the chance to appear in his first major international tournament at Euro 2008. He played in all three of Russia's group D matches, against Spain, Sweden and Greece. In the quarter-finals against the Netherlands he received a yellow card midway through the second half and was then shown a second yellow in the last minute, meaning a red card. However, the referee reversed his decision after consulting with his assistant on the basis that the ball had gone out of play before Kolodin committed the tackle. This was a controversial and much-debated decision at the time. Russia went on to win the match 3–1 in extra time.

Career statistics

Club

International

Statistics accurate as of match played 11 August 2010

Honors

International
Russia
 UEFA European Championship bronze medalist: 2008

References

1982 births
Living people
People from Kamyshin
Russian footballers
Russian people of Belarusian descent
Russia under-21 international footballers
Russia international footballers
FC Olimpia Volgograd players
FC Elista players
PFC Krylia Sovetov Samara players
FC Dynamo Moscow players
FC Rostov players
FC Volga Nizhny Novgorod players
FC Sokol Saratov players
FC Altai Semey players
Russian Premier League players
UEFA Euro 2008 players
Russian expatriate footballers
Expatriate footballers in Kazakhstan
Association football central defenders
Sportspeople from Volgograd Oblast